Teri Whitlinger-Boynton  (born November 13, 1968) is an American former professional tennis player.

Biography

Family
Whitlinger grew up in Neenah, Wisconsin and comes from a family of sportspeople. Her grandfather, Warren, was a basketball player for Ohio State, before going to compete in the professional National Basketball League for Akron. Her father Kip was also an Ohio State basketball player, while her uncle John played tennis professionally. She has a twin sister, Tami, who also played on the WTA Tour.

She is married to tennis coach Craig Boynton.

Tennis career
A four-time All-American at Stanford, Whitlinger won the NCAA doubles championship in 1990, with Meredith McGrath. She finished her collegiate career with a Stanford record win-loss record of 101-6 in dual matches.

Partnering sister Tami, she made the second round of the women's doubles at the 1990 US Open and the third round at the 1991 US Open.

References

External links
  (name of sister is erroneously given on profile)
 

1968 births
Living people
American female tennis players
Stanford Cardinal women's tennis players
Tennis people from Wisconsin
Sportspeople from Neenah, Wisconsin